The 1st Aircraft Carrier Squadron was a formation of Royal Navy aircraft carriers assigned to the British Pacific Fleet in November 1943. It was disbanded in 1947.

Second World War and aftermath
The squadron was formed in November 1943 under the command of Rear-Admiral, Clement Moody, Flag Officer, Aircraft Carriers  (British Pacific Fleet), who also held the title of Rear-Admiral, 1st Aircraft Carrier Squadron, at the same time.
While serving in the Pacific within the U.S. Fifth Fleet, the squadron was designated "Task Group 57.2". During Operation Iceberg off Okinawa, the squadron received heavy Kamikaze attacks. Their armoured flight decks were adequate protection for the hangar decks, but the stress caused deformation of the ships' structures..

 served as squadron flagship for the squadron in 1947.

Korean War 

Flag Officer commanding
Included:

References

Aircraft Carrier squadrons of the Royal Navy
Military units and formations of the Royal Navy in World War II
Military units and formations disestablished in 1945